Eduardo González (born 17 February 1974) is a Puerto Rican swimmer. He competed in the men's 4 × 100 metre freestyle relay event at the 1996 Summer Olympics.

References

1974 births
Living people
Puerto Rican male swimmers
Olympic swimmers of Puerto Rico
Swimmers at the 1996 Summer Olympics
Place of birth missing (living people)
Puerto Rican male freestyle swimmers
20th-century Puerto Rican people